The 2013–14 Skeleton World Cup was a multi-race tournament over a season for skeleton. The season started on 29 November 2013 in Calgary, Canada, and ended on 25 January 2014 in Königssee, Germany. The World Cup was organised by the FIBT who also run World Cups and Championships in bobsleigh.

Calendar 
Below is the schedule of the 2013–14 season.
This edition was covering eight events on seven different tracks in five countries. The fact of having eight events in only seven tracks means that each discipline had one double race over the season.

Results

Men

Women

Standings

Men

Women

See also 
 Skeleton at the 2014 Winter Olympics

References

External links 
 FIBT

Skeleton World Cup
Skeleton World Cup, 2013-14
Skeleton World Cup, 2013-14